Lancashire United Transport (LUT) was a tram, bus and trolleybus operator based at Howe Bridge in Atherton, 10 miles north west of Manchester. It was the largest independent bus operator in the United Kingdom until its acquisition by the Greater Manchester Passenger Transport Executive in 1976.

History
The company was founded in 1905 as Lancashire United Tramways Ltd to assume operation of the South Lancashire Tramways tram system, which had run into financial difficulties. The tram system was centred on the towns of Leigh and Atherton in South Lancashire, with lines running towards St Helens, Wigan, Bolton and Salford.

Trams continued to run under the "South Lancashire Tramways" fleetname, but after World War I LUT took the opportunity to operate motorbus services using the "Lancashire United" fleetname. By 1926, the bus fleet had reached the total of 100 operating over 21 routes. The company changed its name in the same year to Lancashire United Transport and Power Company Ltd to reflect the widened range of business activities.

The company continued to operate routes in South Lancashire until purchased by Greater Manchester Passenger Transport Executive in 1976. LUT remained as an independent subsidiary until 1981 when the company was officially wound up and its assets transferred to Greater Manchester Transport.

See also

 List of bus operators of the United Kingdom

References

Bibliography

External links
 Lancashire United Transport Society
 History of Lancashire United Transport 1905-1981

Historic transport in Lancashire
Tram transport in Greater Manchester
Defunct companies of the United Kingdom
Companies based in the Metropolitan Borough of Wigan
1905 establishments in England
British companies established in 1905
Transport companies established in 1905
Former bus operators in Greater Manchester

Former bus operators in Lancashire